Ma-KING is the third album by Masami Okui, released on September 26, 1997.

Track listing
endless life
 Movie Love & Pop image song
 PS game Advanced V.G 2 theme song
 Lyrics: Masami Okui
 Composition: Masami Okui, Toshiro Yabuki
 Arrangement: Toshiro Yabuki

 OVA Starship Girl Yamamoto Yohko opening song
 Lyrics: Masami Okui
 Composition, arrangement: Toshiro Yabuki
A&C
 Lyrics, composition: Masami Okui
 Arrangement: Tsutomu Ohira
Process
 Radio drama Slayers N.EX image song
 Lyrics, composition: Masami Okui
 Arrangement: Tsutomu Ohira

 Radio drama Slayers N.EX ending song
 Lyrics, composition: Masami Okui
 Arrangement: Toshiro Yabuki
Spicy Essence
 Lyrics, composition: Masami Okui
 Arrangement: Tsutomu Ohira
Naked Mind (dynamix)
 Radio drama Slayers N.EX opening song
 Lyrics: Masami Okui
 Composition, arrangement: Toshiro Yabuki
Precious wing (light wind version)
 Lyrics: Masami Okui
 Composition, arrangement: Toshiro Yabuki
more than words ～in my heart～
 Lyrics: Yukiko Sato (Japanese lyrics: Masami Okui)
 Composition: Masami Okui
 Arrangement: Tsutomu Ohira
I can't... (daydremix)
 Lyrics: Masami Okui
 Composition, arrangement: Toshiro Yabuki
J (wild beat version)
 OVA Jungle de Ikou! opening song
 Lyrics: Masami Okui
 Composition, arrangement: Toshiro Yabuki
 (red rose version)
 Anime television series Revolutionary Girl Utena opening song
 Lyrics: Masami Okui
 Composition, arrangement: Toshiro Yabuki
spirit of the globe
 OVA Jungle de Ikou! ending song
 Lyrics, composition: Masami Okui
 Arrangement: Toshiro Yabuki

 Lyrics, composition: Masami Okui
 Arrangement: Tsutomu Ohira

Sources
Official website: Makusonia

1997 albums
Masami Okui albums